The Texas Bad Man is a 1932 American Western film directed by Edward Laemmle, written by Jack Cunningham and Richard Schayer, and starring Tom Mix, Lucille Powers, Willard Robertson, Fred Kohler, Joseph W. Girard and Tetsu Komai. It was released on June 30, 1932, by Universal Pictures.

Plot

Cast 
Tom Mix as Tom Logan
Lucille Powers as Nancy Keefe
Willard Robertson as Milton Keefe
Fred Kohler as Gore Hampton
Joseph W. Girard as Ranger Captain Charley Carter
Tetsu Komai as Yat Gow
Edward LeSaint as Banker Chester Bigelow
Tony the Horse as Tony

References

External links 
 

1932 films
American Western (genre) films
1932 Western (genre) films
Universal Pictures films
Films directed by Edward Laemmle
American black-and-white films
1930s English-language films
1930s American films
Films with screenplays by Richard Schayer